Calystegia occidentalis is a species of morning glory known by the common name chaparral false bindweed.

It is native to California and Oregon, where it grows in hilly and mountain habitat, such as woodland and chaparral slopes and the high Sierra Nevada.

Description
Calystegia occidentalis is a woody perennial herb producing spreading or twisting and climbing branches, usually quite hairy in texture. The small leaves are up to 4 centimeters long and lobed into various spade or arrowhead shapes.

The inflorescence is one to four flowers atop a single peduncle, each bloom 2 to 5 centimeters wide and white to cream to yellow in color.

References

External links
 Calflora: Calystegia occidentalis (bush morning glory,  chaparral false bindweed, western morning glory)
Jepson Manual Treatment: Calystegia occidentalis
UC Photos gallery — Calystegia occidentalis

occidentalis
Flora of California
Flora of Oregon
Flora of the Klamath Mountains
Flora of the Sierra Nevada (United States)
Natural history of the California chaparral and woodlands
Natural history of the California Coast Ranges
Natural history of the Peninsular Ranges
Natural history of the Transverse Ranges
Flora without expected TNC conservation status